HP-10 or variant, may refer to:

HP10, a postcode for High Wycombe
Hewlett-Packard HP-10, handheld printing adding machine, manufactured 1977-1979
HP-10C, a calculator in the Hewlett-Packard Voyager series
HP 10s, Hewlett Packard student scientific calculator
HP-10B, Hewlett Packard student business calculator
Schreder Airmate HP-10, glider

See also
 HP (disambiguation)